The World Apostolic Congress on Mercy (WACOM) was a religious event launched by Pope Benedict XVI that draws from the teachings of Faustina Kowalska..The first WACOM occurred in Rome in 2008 with subsequent events in Kraków (2011), Bogotá (2014) and Manila (2017). The inaugural event at the Vatican drew four thousand from two hundred delegations. In 2014, a delegation of one thousand went to the Congress in Colombia, and the 2017 event involved more than five thousand attendees.

The Congress' current status is unknown as of June 2021.

See also
 Divine Mercy

References

External links
 WACOM website

Triennial events
Recurring events established in 2008
Christian conferences
Divine Mercy
Culture in Rome
Culture in Kraków
Culture in Bogotá
Manila